Firuzabad-e Tayemeh (also Romanized as Fīrūzābād-e Ţāyemeh; also known as Fīrūzābād) is a village in Tariq ol Eslam Rural District, in the Central District of Nahavand County, Hamadan Province, Iran. At the 2006 census, its population was 258, in 72 families.

References 

Populated places in Nahavand County